Edwin Gilbert (July 15, 1907 – August 24, 1976) was a novelist and playwright/scriptwriter who authored popular novels, including Native Stone in 1956.

Gilbert was born in Mannheim, Germany in 1907 and moved to Detroit in the United States as a child.  He studied architecture at the University of Michigan, but went into play writing after winning a prize for a one-act play.  Moving to New York City, he wrote plays, as well as some magazine work.  During World War II, he served in the United States Army Air Forces, for which he wrote documentary films.  After the war, he published a number of novels, including best sellers Native Stone (1956) and Silver Spoon (1957).

In 1968, he signed the Writers and Editors War Tax Protest pledge, vowing to refuse tax payments in protest against the Vietnam War.

Gilbert was married to wife Virginia for 32 years before they divorced in 1973.

Selected bibliography
 The Squirrel Cage (1947)
 The Hot and the Cool (1953)
 Native Stone (1956)
 Silver Spoon (1957)
 The New Ambassadors (1961)
 The Beautiful Life (1967)
 A Season in Monte Carlo (1976)

References

External links

Edwin Gilbert Collection, at Howard Gotlieb Archival Research Center, Boston University

1907 births
1976 deaths
20th-century American novelists
American male novelists
American tax resisters
Taubman College of Architecture and Urban Planning alumni
20th-century American dramatists and playwrights
American male dramatists and playwrights
20th-century American male writers